International students, or foreign students, are students who undertake all or part of their tertiary education in a country other than their own and move to that country for the purpose of studying.

In 2019, there were over 6 million international students, up from 2 million in 2000. The most popular destinations were the United States (with 976,853 international students), Australia (509,160 students), and the United Kingdom (489,019 students), which together receive 33% of international students.

National definitions

The definitions of "foreign student" and "international student" vary from country to country depending on the educational system of the country 

In the US, international students are "[i]ndividuals studying in the United States on a non-immigrant, temporary visa that allows for academic study at the post- secondary level." The students who hold a F1 visa consider as International students. 

In Europe, students from countries who are a part of the European Union can take part in a student exchange program called the Erasmus Programme. The program allows for students from the EU to study in other countries under a government agreement.

Canada defines international students as "non-Canadian students who do not have 'permanent resident' status and have had to obtain the authorization of the Canadian government to enter Canada with the intention of pursuing an education." The study permit identifies the level of study and the length of time the individual may study in Canada. Unless it takes more than six months, international students do not need a study permit if they will finish the course within the period of stay authorized upon entry.

In Australia, an international student "is not an Australian citizen, Australian permanent resident, New Zealand citizen, or a holder of an Australian permanent resident humanitarian visa."

According to the Institute of International Education, an international student in Japan is "[a] student from a foreign economy who is receiving an education at any Japanese university, graduate school, junior college, college of technology, professional training college or university preparatory course and who resides in Japan with a 'college student' visa status."

Destinations of foreign students

Student mobility in the first decade of the 21st century has been transformed by three major external events: the terrorists attack of 9/11, the global financial recession of 2008, and an increasingly isolationist political order characterized by Brexit in the U.K. and the election of Donald Trump in the U.S. The mobility of international students is influenced by many factors, particularly changes to the visa and immigration policies of destination countries that impact the availability of employment during and after education. Political developments are often a major consideration; for example, a survey conducted before the 2020 presidential election in the U.S. indicated that a quarter of prospective international students were more likely to study in the country if Joseph R. Biden was elected president.

Australia has by far the highest ratio of international students per head of population in the world by a large margin, with international students represented on average 26.7% of the student bodies of Australian universities.

The greatest percentage increases of numbers of foreign students have occurred in New Zealand, Korea, the Netherlands, Greece, Spain, Italy, and Ireland.

Traditionally the US and UK have been the most prestigious choices, because of the presence of top 10 rankings Universities such as Harvard, Oxford, MIT, and Cambridge. More recently however they have had to compete with the rapidly growing Asian higher education market, especially China. In the 2020 CWTS Leiden Ranking edition, China surpassed the US with the number of universities including in the ranking for the first time (204 vs.198). China is also home to the two best C9 league universities (Tsinghua and Peking) in the Asia-Pacific and emerging countries with its shared rankings at 16th place in the world by the 2022 Times Higher Education World University Rankings. While US is the leading destination for foreign students, there is increasing competition from several destinations in East Asia such as China, Korea, Japan and Taiwan which are keen to attract foreign students for reputation and demographic reasons.

According to OECD, almost one out of five foreign students is regionally mobile. This segment of regionally mobile students who seek global education at local cost is defined as "glocal" students]. Many "glocal" students consider pursuing transnational or cross-border education which allows them to earn a foreign credential while staying in their home countries. With the increase in tuition cost in leading destinations like the US and the UK along with the higher immigration barriers, many international students are exploring alternative destinations and demanding more "value for money." Recalibrating value for money for international students It is projected that the number of internationally mobile students will reach 6.9 million by 2030, an increase of 51%, or 2.3 million students, from 2015. The affordability of international education is an area of concern not only for international students but also universities and nations interested in attracting them.

, the top 10 countries for foreign student enrollment according to Institute of International Education:

, the top 10 countries for foreign student enrollment according to UNESCO:

Asia

China 

In 2016, China was the third largest receiver of international students globally, with 442,773 international students. By 2018 this number had grown to 492,185 (10.49% growth from 2017).

The number of international students in China has grown steadily since 2003, with apparently no impact from the rise of terrorism or the 2008 global financial crisis. In contrast to the reported decline of enrollments in the USA and the UK, China's international student market continues to strengthen. China is now the leading destination globally for Anglophone African students.

In 2016, the students coming to China were mostly from Asia (60%), followed by Europe (16%) and Africa (14%). However, Africa had the highest growth rate at 23.7% year-on-year 2015–2016.

The top 15 countries sending students to China in 2018 are listed below. African countries are grouped together and show a considerable block of students.

In 2016, international students mostly went to study in the major centers of Beijing (77,234, 17.44%) and Shanghai (59,887, 13.53%). In recent years there has been a decentralization and dispersion of students to other provinces.

Various factors combine to make China a desirable destination for international students.

 China boasts a significant number of world-class universities. 
 Universities in China are attractive research centers. 
 It costs relatively less than studying in developed countries.
 There is a huge diversity of universities and programs.
 There are more career opportunities due to China's growing economic strength.
 Many graduate and postgraduate programs are offered in English.
 A huge number of scholarships (49,022 in 2016) are on offer from the Chinese government.

China is openly pursuing a policy of growing its soft power globally, by way of persuasion and attraction. Attracting international students, especially by way of scholarships, is one effective way of growing this influence.

India
India is an emerging destination for international students. India hosted 49,348 students from 168 countries during the 2019-20 academic year, with the top 10 countries accounting for 63.9% of all international students.

In 2019, India was hosting over 47,000 overseas students and aims to quadruple the number 200,000 students by 2023. India has most its international students and targets from South, Southeast, West Asia and Africa and is running various fee waiver and scholarship programs.

Japan 
Japan is perceived as an evolving destination for international students. Japan has around 180,000 overseas students studying at its institutions and the government has set targets to increase this to 300,000 over the next few years.

Malaysia and Singapore 
Malaysia, Singapore and India are emerging destinations for international students. These three countries have combined share of approximately 12% of the global student market with somewhere between 250,000 and 300,000 students having decided to pursue higher education studies in these countries in 2005–2006.

The flow of international students above indicates the south-north phenomenon. In this sense, students from Asia prefer to pursue their study, particularly in the United States.

The recent statistics on mobility of international students can be found in;
The 2009 Global Education Digest (GED) by UNESCO
International Flows of Mobile Students at the Tertiary Level by UNESCO
Empowering People to Innovate - International Mobility by OECD.

Australia and Oceania 

Australia has the highest ratio of international students per head of population in the world by a large margin, with 775,475 international students enrolled in the nation's universities and vocational institutions in 2020. Accordingly, in 2019, international students represented on average 26.7% of the student bodies of Australian universities. International education, therefore, represents one of the country's largest exports and has a pronounced influence on the country's demographics, with a significant proportion of international students remaining in Australia after graduation on various skill and employment visas.

Top 15 countries and regions sending students to Australia in 2018 are listed below.

Europe

France and Germany 
In 2016, France was the fourth largest receiver of international students globally, with 245,349 international students, In just a matter of three years, from 2017 to 2020, France has gone from 324,000 international students to 358,000. This is a significant increase of more than 10.4%. while Germany was the fifth largest receiver, with 244,575 international students. In the winter semester 2017–18, Germany received 374,583 international students from overseas pursuing higher education and the Compound Annual Growth Rate (CAGR) is 5.46%. Since the 2016/17 academic year, the number of foreign students attending university in Germany has constantly risen, climbing from 358,895 students five years ago to 411,601 students last year.

With the Franco-German University, the two countries have established a framework for cooperation between their universities, enabling students to participate in specific Franco-German courses of study across borders.

The top 10 countries sending students to France in 2016 are listed below.

The top 10 countries sending students to Germany in 2015 are listed below.

United Kingdom 

Top 15 countries and regions sending students to the United Kingdom in 2021/22 are listed below.

Netherlands 
As of 2017, 81,000 international students studied in the Netherlands, compromising 11.6 percent of the higher education student population across all degree levels (bachelors, masters, and PhD students). Of these students, 12,500 students or 15.4% were Dutch nationals who had studied elsewhere previously. Most international students in the Netherlands come from European Union countries (roughly three-fourths), with the largest segment of that population coming from Germany. Of the non-EU students, the largest portion is composed of Chinese students. Two-thirds of all international students come to the Netherlands for their bachelor's degree.

Russia 
Russia, since the Soviet times, has been a hub for international students, mainly from the developing world. It is the world's fifth-leading destination for international students, hosting roughly 300 thousand in 2019.

The top 10 countries sending students to Russia in 2019  are listed below.

North America

Canada 

Immigration, Refugees and Citizenship Canada (IRCC) reckons that as of December 2019, there were 642,480 international students which is a 13% increase from the previous year. In 2019, 30% of the international students in Canada were from India and 25% were from China. The newest Canadian government International Education Strategy (IES) for the period 2019-2024 includes a commitment to diversify inbound students and distribute them more equally across the country rather than having a strong concentration in a few cities.

Top 15 countries and regions sending students to Canada in 2019 are listed below.

United States 
Around 750,000 Chinese and 400,000 Indian students apply to overseas higher education institutions annually. New enrollment of undergraduate and graduate foreign students at American universities and colleges for 2016-17 declined by 2.1% or nearly 5,000 students which translates into a potential revenue of US$125 million for the first year of studies alone. Much of the increase in international students in the US during 2013–2014 was fueled by undergraduate students from China. The number of Chinese students increased to 31 percent of all foreign students in the US, the highest concentration of any one country since the Institute of International Education began collecting data on international students in 1948. This is changing quickly with demographic projections showing a large impending decrease in volumes of students from China and Russia and steady increases in students from India and Africa.

The number of foreign students in tertiary (university or college) education is also rapidly increasing as higher education becomes an increasingly global venture. During 2014–15, 974,926 foreign students came to study in the US, which is almost double the population from 2005. For several decades Chinese students have been the largest demographic amongst foreign students. The top 10 sending places of origin and percentage of total foreign student enrollment are: China, India, South Korea, Saudi Arabia, Canada, Brazil, Taiwan, Japan, Vietnam, and Mexico. The total number of foreign students from all places of origin by field of study are: Business/Management, Engineering, Mathematics and Computer Sciences, Social Sciences, Physical and Life Sciences, Humanities, Fine and Applied Arts, Health Professions, Education, and Agriculture.

Top 15 sending places of origin and percentage of total foreign student enrollment 2018-2019

Total number of foreign students from all places of origin by field of study 2015-2016

The number of US visas issued to Chinese students to study at US universities has increased by 30 per cent, from more than 98,000 in 2009 to nearly 128,000 in October 2010, placing China as the top country of origin for foreign students, according to the "2010 Open Doors Report" published on the US Embassy in China website. 
The number of Chinese students increased. Overall, the total number of foreign students with a US visa to study at colleges and universities increased by 3 per cent to a record high of nearly 691,000 in the 2009/2010 academic year. 
The 30 per cent increase in Chinese student enrolment was the main contributor to that year's growth, and now Chinese students account for more than 18 percent of the total foreign students.

Requirements
Prospective foreign students are usually required to sit for language tests, such as Cambridge English: First, Cambridge English: Advanced, Cambridge English: Proficiency, IELTS, TOEFL, iTEP, PTE Academic, DELF or DELE, before they are admitted. Tests notwithstanding, while some international students already possess an excellent command of the local language upon arrival, some find their language ability, considered excellent domestically, inadequate for the purpose of understanding lectures, and/or of conveying oneself fluently in rapid conversations. A research report commissioned by NAFSA: Association of International Educators investigated the scope of third-party providers offerings intensive English preparation programs with academic credit for international students in the United States. These pathway programs are designed to recruit and support international students needing additional help with English and academic preparation before matriculating to a degree program.

Student visa
Generally, foreign students as citizens of other countries are required to obtain a student visa, which ascertains their legal status for staying in the second country. In the United States, before students come to the country, the students must select a school to attend to qualify for a student visa. The course of study and the type of school a foreign student plans to attend determine whether an F-1 visa or an M-1 visa is needed. Each student visa applicant must prove they have the financial ability to pay for their tuition, books and living expenses while they study in the states.

Economic impact
Research from the National Association of Foreign Student Advisers (NAFSA) shows the economic benefits of the increasing international higher-education enrollment in the United States. According to their 2021–2022 academic year analysis, nearly one million international students contributed $33.8 billion to the US economy and 335,000 jobs. This represents almost a 19% increase in dollars compared to the previous year.
International students contribute more than job and monetary gains to the economy. “The increase in economic activity is certainly positive news but it should be kept in perspective: it shows we’ve only regained about half the ground lost in the previous academic year,” said Dr. Esther D. Brimmer, NAFSA executive director and CEO. “We must not be complacent that this upward trend will automatically continue. 
According to NAFSA's research, their diverse views contribute to technological innovation has increased America's ability to compete in the global economy.

On the other hand, international students have faced suspicions of involvement in economic and industrial espionage.

Higher education marketing
Marketing of higher education is a well-entrenched macro process today, especially in the major English-speaking nations: Australia, Canada, New Zealand, the UK, and the USA. One of the major factors behind the worldwide evolution of educational marketing could be globalization, which has dramatically shrunken the world. Due to intensifying competition for overseas students amongst MESDCs, i.e. major English-speaking destination countries, higher educational institutions recognize the significance of marketing themselves, in the international arena. To build sustainable international student recruitment strategies Higher Education Institutions (HEIs) need to diversify the markets from which they recruit, both to take advantage of future growth potential from emerging markets, and to reduce dependency on – and exposure to risk from – major markets such as China, India and Nigeria, where demand has proven to be volatile. For recruitment strategies, there are some approaches that higher education institutions adopt to ensure stable enrollments of international students, such as developing university preparation programs, like the Global Assessment Certificate (GAC) Program, and launching international branch campuses in foreign countries.

Global Assessment Certificate (GAC) Program
The Global Assessment Certification (GAC) Program is a university preparation program, developed and provided by ACT Education Solution, Ltd., for the purpose of helping students to prepare for admission and enrollment overseas. The program helps students from non-English speaking backgrounds to prepare for university-level study, so they are able to successfully finish a bachelor's degree at university. Students who complete the GAC program have the opportunity to be admitted to 120 so called Pathway Universities, located in destinations including the United States, the United Kingdom, and Canada.
Mainly, the program consists of curriculums, such as Academic English, Mathematics, Computing, Study Skills, Business, Science and Social Science. Moreover, the program also provides the opportunity to get prepared for the ACT exam and English Proficiency tests like TOEFL and IELTS.

Foreign branch campuses
Opening international branch campuses is a new strategy for recruiting foreign students in other countries in order to build strong global outreach by overcoming the limitations of physical distance. Indeed, opening branch campuses plays a significant role of widening the landscape of the higher education. In the past, along with high demand for higher education, many universities in the United States established their branch campuses in foreign countries. According to a report by the Observatory on Borderless Higher Education (OBHE), there was a 43% increase in the number of foreign branch campuses in the worldwide scale since 2006. American higher education institutions mostly take a dominant position in growth rate and the number of foreign branch campuses, accounting for almost 50 percent of current foreign branch campuses. However, some research reports have recently said foreign branch campuses are facing several challenges and setbacks, for example interference of local government,
sustainability problems, and long-term prospects like damage on academic reputations and finance.

Challenges for foreign students in English-speaking countries

There is a trend for more and more students to go abroad to study in the US, Canada, UK, and Australia to gain a broader education. English is the only common language spoken at universities in these countries, with the most significant exception being Francophone universities in Canada. International students need not only to acquire good communication skills and fluent English, both in writing and speaking, but also to absorb the Western academic writing culture in style, structure, reference, and the local policy toward academic integrity in academic writing. International students may have difficulty completing satisfactory assignments because of the difficulty with grammar and spelling, differences in culture, or a lack of confidence in English academic writing. Insightful opinions may lose the original meaning when transformed from the student's native language to English. Even if international students acquire good scores in English proficiency exams or are able to communicate with native students frequently in class, they often find that the wording and formatting of academic papers in English-speaking universities are different from what they are used to due to certain cultural abstractions. Students who experience this discrepancy get lower scores for adaptability to new environment and higher scores for anxiety. Instead of the mood, students who were further away from home would be more willing to go back home and regress from their aims in life; this hardship can lead to depression. This will cause the international student to have a bad experience of the foreign country and its culture, and will more likely not recommend the country to others. Partly this is due to the academic contagions of the foreign university like not integrating contrastive rhetoric aspect, low support for adaptation like providing opportunities for developing their employability skills to better their English in a non-competitive and meaningful way.

Most foreign students encounter difficulties in language use. Such issues make it difficult for the student to make domestic friends and gain familiarity with the local culture. Sometimes, these language barriers can subject international students to ignorance or disrespect from native speakers. Most international students also lack support groups in the country where they are studying. Although all colleges in North America that are in student exchange programs do have an International Student Office, it sometimes does not have the resources and capability to consider their students' individual needs when it comes to adapting to the new environment. The more students a particular college has who come from the same country, the better the support is for getting involved in the new culture.

Foreign students face several challenges in their academic studies at North American universities. Studies have shown that these challenges include several different factors: inadequate English proficiency; unfamiliarity with North American culture; lack of appropriate study skills or strategies; academic learning anxiety; low social self-efficacy; financial difficulties; and separation from family and friends. Despite the general perception that American culture is diverse rather than homogenous, the American ideology of cultural homogeneity has been alleged to imply an American mindset that because Eurocentric cultures are superior to others, people with different cultures should conform to the dominant monocultural canon and norms.

US colleges and universities have long welcomed students from China, whose higher education system cannot meet the demand. 10 million students throughout China take the national college entrance test, competing for 5.7 million university places. Because foreign undergraduates typically fail to qualify for US federal aid, colleges can provide only limited financial help. Now, thanks to China's booming economy in recent years, more Chinese families can afford to pay.

US colleges also face challenges abroad. Worries about fraud on test scores and transcripts make occasional headlines. And even Chinese students who score highly on an English-language proficiency test may not be able to speak or write well enough to stay up to speed in a US classroom, where essay writing and discussions are common. Chinese international students face other challenges besides language proficiency. The Chinese educational structure focuses on exam-oriented education, with educational thinking and activities aimed towards meeting the entrance examination. Students become more focused on exam performance, and teachers are inclined to focus on lecturing to teach students what may be on the test. In addition, "parents are also convinced that the more students listened to the lectures, the better they would score on the finals." With more than 304,040 Chinese students enrolled in the US in 2014/15, China is by far the leading source of international students at American universities and colleges; however, there are three waves of growth in Chinese students in the US.

Each of the three waves differs in terms of needs and expectations and corresponding support services needed. Unfortunately, many higher education institutions have not adapted to the changing needs. It is no surprise that many Chinese students are now questioning if it is worth investing in studying abroad.

International students also face cross-cultural barriers that hinder their ability to succeed in a new environment. For example, there are differences in terms of receiving and giving feedback, which influences academic engagement and even the job and internship search approach of international students.

Transparency is an issue that international students face when coming across activities within class, specifically when it comes to group discussions, it may be a bigger obstacle. Firstly, the issue of how topics being discussed may not need further elaboration when it comes to local students and for an international student, the ability of the student to be able to understand and contribute may diminish in return. This may be due to the feeling of dismissal via the appearance of lack of interest in their opinion. Another would be the failure of expected scaffolding during group discussions when it comes to international students. This is due to the need for a developed understanding of local culture, or "cultural facts" as represented by Kim. This represents the knowledge of humor, vernacular, or simple connotations in speech that may allow international students to further develop an understanding of a given topic.

Plagiarism is the most serious offense in academia. Plagiarism has two subtle forms, one of which includes the omission of elements required for proper citations and references. The second form is unacknowledged use or incorporation of another person's work or achievement.  Violation of either form can result in a student's expulsion. For the international students the word plagiarism is a foreign word. Most of them are unfamiliar with American academic standards and colleges are not good about giving a clear definition of the word's meaning. For example, many international students don't know using even one sentence of someone else's work can be considered plagiarism. Most colleges give students an E on their plagiarized assignments and future offenses often result in failing class or being kicked out of university.

Mental wellness 
International students studying in a foreign country face a life-altering event which can cause distress that can potentially affect their mental wellness. Many students report homesickness and loneliness in their initial transition, experience isolation from peers and struggle with understanding cultural differences while staying abroad. In certain cultures, mental illness is seen as a sign of weakness. Because of this, international students believe they can prevail through their struggles alone without help, which can lead to a decrease in mental wellness. 

There are two common symptoms among international students from China in particular: 45 percent of the students faced depression and 29 percent of the students faced anxiety. Stressors that lead international students to struggle with anxiety are rooted in numerous causes, including academic pressures, financial issues, adapting to a new culture, creating friendships, and feelings of loneliness. International students are also more likely to rely on peers for support through their transition than teachers or adult peers. If the student is unable to make friends in their new environment, they will struggle more with their transition than an international student who has established relationships with their peers. During the COVID-19 pandemic, many international students started remote learning and had to overcome time differences to take classes online, which further led to sleep disruption, social isolation, and thus, higher rates of mental health symptoms.

Language and communication barriers have been noted to add to student anxiety and stress. International students face language discrimination, which may exacerbate mental health symptoms. Evidence has not conclusively shown that language discrimination is a greater risk factor than discrimination against foreigners. However, there has not been any conclusive evidence to show whether language discrimination plays a significantly larger role than simple foreigner discrimination.

Since international students are less likely to use individual counseling provided by the university. and may experience even more intense stigmas against seeking professional help, group-oriented ways of reaching students may be more helpful. Group activities, like collaborative workshops and cultural exchange groups, can introduce a sense of community among the students. In addition, efforts can be placed to improve awareness and accessibility to mental wellness resources and counseling services. Social workers, faculty, and academic staff can be educated beforehand to provide an adequate support for them.

Study abroad

Studying abroad is the act of a student pursuing educational opportunities in a country other than one's own. This can include primary, secondary and post-secondary students. A 2012 study showed number of students studying abroad represents about 9.4% of all students enrolled at institutions of higher education in the United States and it is a part of experience economy.

Studying abroad is a valuable program for international students as it is intended to increase the students' knowledge and understanding of other cultures. International education not only helps students with their language and communicating skills. It also encourages students to develop a different perspective and cross-cultural understanding of their studies which will further their education and benefit them in their career. The main factors that determine the outcome quality of international studies are transaction dynamics (between the environmental conditions and the international student), quality of environment, and the student's coping behavior.

Distinctions in classroom culture 

Certain distinctions and differences can become sources of culture shock and cultural misunderstandings that can lead a student to inhibit adaptation and adjustment. For example, a key requirement in many American institutions is participation in classroom discussions and activities. Failure to participate in the classroom with faculty can be a serious obstacle to good grades. This is particularly a problem for international students who come from countries with the view that professors are to be held in awe, and not questioned. Then the problem can be reflected in the grades given for class participation. Lack of participation can be interpreted by some American faculty as failure to learn the course content or disinterest in the topic. This is important in American classrooms which ideally require students to go through double loop of learning where they have to re-frame their dispositions and form a framework of inner agency. Some of the identified distinctions identified by the American Association of International Educators are:

 Semester system has three models: they are (1) the semester system comprising two terms, one in fall and one in winter/spring (summer term is not required); (2) the trimester system comprising three terms that includes summer (one of these terms can be a term of vacation); and (3) the quarter system comprising the four terms of fall, winter, spring, and summer, and in which the student can choose one of them to take as a vacation.
 The schedule of the classes is a standard five-day week for classes, but the instruction hours in a week may be divided into a variety of models. Two common models of choice are Monday/Wednesday/Friday (MWF) and Tuesday/Thursday (TT) model. As a result, the class hours per week are the same, but the length of time per class for the MWF will be different from the TT.
 Most foreign institutes value the ideologies of fairness and independence. These standards ensure the rights and responsibilities of all students, regardless of background. Most institutions that define the rights and responsibilities of their students also provide a code of conduct to guide their behavior, because independence and freedom come with responsibilities.
 Certain immigration regulations allow international students to gain practical experience during their studies through employment in their field of study like an internship during study, and at other times for one year of employment after the student completes their studies. The eligibility factors are often disseminated through international students office at the college or university.
 Faculty differ both in rank and by the duration of their contracts. (1) Distinguished teaching and research faculty hold the most honored rank among faculty. They typically have the doctoral degree and are usually tenured (i.e. on a permanent contract with the school until they retire) and record of their personal excellence accounts for their standing; (2) Emeritus professors are honored faculty who have retired from the university but continue to teach or undertake research at colleges and universities; (3) Full professors are also tenured and hold the doctoral degree. It is length of service and the support of departmental chairpersons, colleagues, and administrators that leads to the promotion to this rank; (4) Associate professors typically hold the doctoral degree and are the most recent to receive tenure; (5) Assistant professors may or may not yet have their doctoral degrees and have held their teaching or research posts for less than seven years; (6) Instructors are usually the newest faculty. They may or may not hold the doctoral degree and are working towards tenure; (7) Adjunct professors and visiting professors may hold professorial rank at another institution. They are not tenured (usually retained on a year by year contract) and they are often honored members of the university community.
 Most institutes that accept international students have faculty who are leaders that can integrate the best elements of teacher-centered and learner centered pedagogical styles that integrates and leads students of every background to a path of success. They are careful not to obstruct a student with their own personality or achievements and maintain a resourceful, open and supportive "holding environment". Simplified, meaningful resource dissemination and engaging students in participatory and active learning is the key to this mixed learning. Lack of skill in handling such pedagogical methods might result in straining the students from a "polyvagal perspective" (taking classes in a restless pace disregarding the quality and quantity of the information transferred, which translates as lack of internal agency to make students learn meaningful content by being an educational agent - lack of teacher agency) and at other instances downgrade into a liberal laissez-faire style which might negatively affect students' performance. The skill of the tutor is exemplified in many forms one such as when they are able to keep some students from dominating (attention seeking, disruptive or disrespectful) and to draw in those who are reticent in a participatory section.
 Students are expected to know the content of their courses from the class website (structure of the course, frame of reference, jargon) and to think independently about it and to express their own perspectives and opinions in class and in their written work. Open disagreement is a sign of violent intentions in certain cultures and in other cultures it is merely expressing one's opinion; this aspect can be challenging if proper people skills are absent in the group and group development is not given importance. Similar is the case with asking questions: in certain classroom cultures it is tolerated to ask vague questions and this is interpreted as a sign of interest from the student whereas in other cultures asking vague questions is a display of ignorance in public that results in loss of face and embarrassment, even if this behavior is counterproductive for a learning environment, it is largely dependent upon the transaction dynamics in classroom cultures. There are also certain institutes and cultures that disallow student discussion at certain topics and keep limitations to what can be discussed and punitive means for deterring from topics that shouldn't be discussed. But often direct communication is considered vital for academic survival.
 Foreign university programs differ from structured programs of universities in certain countries. In each quarter the student is given choice to select the courses they deem important to them for gaining credits. There is no proportion for the number of courses that a student can take in each term; however, program fees paid at a single time can lead to fees deduction in each quarter. In general, students are not recommended to take many courses at a time as they require to gain a certain number of credits to pass a quarter which is dependent upon the grades that they obtain from the courses, and these credits have little to do with the actual credit hours spent for each courses. For the courses students have to pre-register as they are not automatically assigned. Though it is an open structure for course selections, students might be required to take certain compulsory courses for the program as maintained by departments for degree standardization.
 Foreign institutions differ in their requirement of the content that a student is required to be familiarized with, and this difference is identifiable in programs which have similar objectives and structures of different universities. Some may be professionally oriented and thus give importance to depth in certain areas, and some might be for providing a breadth of knowledge on the subject. Commonly, some institutes might require the student to master the essentials of a subject as a whole, while others might require the student to master large quantities of content on the subject which might not seem practical in a framework of short period of time (An example is 10,000-Hour Rule). More accessible institutions provide a syllabus of their previous and current programs and courses for better pre- and post- program communication.
 Classroom etiquette may differ from institute to institute. In western institutes the old standard of practice for students to address faculty is by their last name and the title "Professor", but it is not uncommon for faculty to be on a first-name basis with students today. However, it is a good etiquette to check with the faculty member before addressing him or her by their first name only. Both students and faculty often dress very informally, and it is not unusual for faculty to roam the classroom while talking or to sit on the edge of a table in a very relaxed posture. Relaxed dress and posture are not, however, signs of relaxed standards of performance. Sometimes faculty, administrators, and even staff may sometimes hold receptions or dinners for their students. In that case, students should ask what the dress should be for the occasion; sometimes students will be expected to wear professional dress (suit coat and tie for men, and a suit or more formal dresses for women). Faculty would not care even if they elicit the need of participation in the classroom or are personally involved with students; even if they engage students in frameworks/styles the student might understand the topic. This is because the faculty-student relationship is considered to be professional. Relationships in the West are most often determined by some kind of function. Here the function is guidance, education and skill development.
 In occidental institutions students are evaluated in many ways, including exams, papers, lab reports, simulation results, oral presentations, attendance and participation in classroom discussion. The instructors use a variety of types of exams, including multiple choice, short answer, and essay. Most adept instructors provide guides or models of assignment construction, framing and asking questions about how to prepare for their exams. Most students are expected to be creative in presentation (to avoid similarity in paper submissions), systematic in formatting (citation: Style guide) and invested for drawing and providing positive individualism to the group/class (group purpose, role identity for autonomy, positive thinking, value oriented responsible self-expression, etc. vs. attendant selfishness, alienation, divisiveness, etc.) aligned with the common development objective.
 Relationships are an important part of the foreign academic experience and for healthy social support. Relationships with faculty (instructors and academic advisors) are very important for academic success and for bridging the cultural gap. But in off-campus venues, the student can appreciate their life outside of campus, and every time they view one another as individuals, avoid asking favors that can affect teacher-student comfort zones and expect cautiousness from them in an attempt to avoid notions of favoritism and friendliness to break down barriers of role and culture.

A key factor in international academic success is learning approaches that can be taken on a matter from one another and simultaneously assimilating inter-cultural experiences.

Titles and roles in administrative structure 
 The vice-chancellor or vice-president for academic affairs manages the various schools and departments.
 The council of deans oversees the separate schools, institutes, and programs offered by the university or college.
 The departmental chairperson manages the affairs of the separate departments in each school or college.
 Faculty is responsible for teaching and research in and beyond the classroom.
 Secretaries and technical support staff in foreign countries have much authority than their counterparts in certain countries. They are treated respectfully by faculty and students alike.

Accommodation 

Accommodation is a major factor that determines study abroad experience.

Host family 
A host family volunteers to house a student during their program. The family receives payment for hosting. Students are responsible for their own spending, including school fees, uniform, text books, internet, and phone calls. Host families could be family units with or without children or retired couples; most programs require one host to be at least 25 years of age. The host families are well prepared to experience a new culture and give a new cultural experience to the student. A student could live with more than one family during their international study program to expand their knowledge and experience more of the new culture. Host families are responsible for providing a room, meals, and a stable family environment for the student. Most international student advisory's allow for a switch of hosts if problems arise.

Housing 
An international student involved in study abroad program can choose to live on campus or off campus. Living off campus is a popular choice, because students are more independent and learn more about the new culture when they are on their own. Universities that host international students will offer assistance in obtaining accommodation. Universities in Asia have on-campus housing for international students on exchange or studying full-time. Temporary options include hostels, hotels, or renting. Homestays, paid accommodation with a host family, are available in some countries.

Coping in study abroad

The w-curve adjustment model 

The w-curve model created by Gullahorn and Gullahorn (1963) is W shaped model that attempts to give a visual description of a travelers possible experience of culture shock when entering a new culture and the re-entry shock experienced when returning home. The model has seven stages. Further reviews of the model have been published.

Honeymoon Stage
Hostility Stage
Humorous/Rebounding Stage
In-Sync Stage
Ambivalence Stage
Re-Entry Culture Shock Stage
Re-Socialization Stage

Each stage of the model aims to prepare travellers for the rollercoaster of emotions that they may experience both while returning and traveling from a trip abroad. The hope in the creation of this model is to help prepare travelers for the negative feelings often associated with living in another culture. By doing so, it is the goal that these emotions will be better dealt with.

Positive affectivity 

Affectivity is an emotional disposition: people who are high on positive affectivity experience positive emotions and moods like joy and excitement, and view the world, including themselves and other people, in a positive light. They tend to be cheerful, enthusiastic, lively, sociable, and energetic. Research has found that students studying abroad with a positive emotional tendency have higher satisfaction and interaction with the environment; they engage in the staying country's citizenship behaviours.

Adjustment concepts 
Being relevant to research on coping by international students, the concept of adjustment to a foreign work environment and its operationalisation has been the subject of broad methodological discussion.

See also
Apprentices mobility
EducationUSA
Erasmus programme
F-1 Visa
Fulbright Program
Goodwill Scholarships
International Baccalaureate
International communication
International education
International Student Identity Card
International student ministry
International Students Day
Japanese students in Britain
Monbukagakusho Scholarship
Pakistani students abroad
Student exchange program
Student migration
Study abroad
Vulcanus in Japan

Organizations

 Brethren Colleges Abroad
 International Union of Students
 NAFSA: Association of International Educators
 Journal of International Students

References

Further reading 
 Altbach, Philip. "Foreign study: Patterns and challenges." International Higher Education 30 (2015).  online
 Ammigan, Ravichandran and Jones, Elspeth. "Improving the Student Experience: Learning From a Comparative Study of International Student Satisfaction." Journal of Studies in International Education. 2018;22(4):283-301. online
 Jiani, M. A. "Why and how international students choose Mainland China as a higher education study abroad destination." Higher Education 74.4 (2017): 563–579.
 Liu, Jingzhou. "Internationalization of Higher Education: Experiences of Intercultural Adaptation of International Students in Canada." Antistasis 6.2 (2017).  online
 Mihut, Georgiana, ed. Understanding Higher Education Internationalization (2017) 436pp; reprints selected articles published 2011 to 2016.
 Orleans, Leo A., Chinese Students in America: Policies, Issues, and Numbers, National Academies Press, US National Academies, Office of International Affairs (OIA), 1988.
 Waters, Maurice. "International relations and American institutions of higher learning: a review, "Journal of Conflict Resolution 8.2 (1964): 178–185.
 Wen, Wen, Die Hu, and Jie Hao. "International students' experiences in China: Does the planned reverse mobility work?." International Journal of Educational Development 61 (2018): 204–212. online
 Yan, Kun. Chinese international students' stressors and coping strategies in the United States (Springer Singapore, 2017).

External links

 Global Flow of Tertiary-Level Students UNESCO
 University Mobility in Asia and the Pacific (UMAP)

Student exchange
Study abroad programs
Student migration
International education industry